WMDC may refer to:

 Windows Mobile Device Center
 WMDC (FM), a radio station (98.7 FM) licensed to Mayville, Wisconsin, United States
 Wakefield Metropolitan District Council, a local authority within West Yorkshire, United Kingdom. 
 Weapons of Mass Destruction Commission, an organization funded by the Swedish government and led by Hans Blix
 Wikimedia DC, a local chapter of the Wikimedia Foundation